Sergio Ernesto Gutiérrez Villanueva (born 26 December 1958) is a Mexican politician from the Party of the Democratic Revolution. From 2009 to 2012 he served as Deputy of the LXI Legislature of the Mexican Congress representing Chiapas.

References

1958 births
Living people
Politicians from Chiapas
Party of the Democratic Revolution politicians
21st-century Mexican politicians
Monterrey Institute of Technology and Higher Education alumni
Autonomous University of Tamaulipas alumni
Deputies of the LXI Legislature of Mexico
Members of the Chamber of Deputies (Mexico) for Chiapas